Perštejn is a municipality and village in Chomutov District in the Ústí nad Labem Region of the Czech Republic. It has about 1,100 inhabitants.

Administrative parts
Villages of Černýš, Lužný, Ondřejov, Rájov, Údolíčko and Vykmanov are administrative parts of Perštejn.

References

Villages in Chomutov District